Jacob (Jake) Shulz (October 12, 1901 – August 14, 1983) was a Canadian farmer and politician as well as the father-in-law of Governor General Ed Schreyer.

Shulz was born in Friedensthal, a Bessarabia German community in the Russian Empire, from 1918 part of Romania and today Mirnopolye, Ukraine. He came to Canada with his wife in 1930 to become a farmer in the Gilbert Plains area of Manitoba. He joined the co-operative movement and  became involved in municipal politics.

He was a candidate for the Manitoba Co-operative Commonwealth Federation in the 1949 provincial election losing by 300 votes to Ray Mitchell.

In 1950, Schulz became founding president of the Manitoba Farmers Union and served as chairman of the Interprovincial Farm Union Council in the mid-1950s. He was elected to Parliament in the 1957 general election representing Springfield for the Co-operative Commonwealth Federation. He only served for a year before losing his seat in the 1958 federal election that elected a landslide majority government for the Progressive Conservative Party of Canada.

Shulz founded a construction company in 1960 and wrote a book, The Rise and Fall of Farm Organizations.

His daughter, Lily is to married Ed Schreyer who, in the 1965 federal election, was elected a CCF MP from Schulz' old riding of Springfield.

References

External links
 

1901 births
1983 deaths
Co-operative Commonwealth Federation MPs
20th-century Canadian politicians
Bessarabia-German people
Canadian people of German descent
Farmers from Manitoba
Romanian emigrants to Canada
Members of the House of Commons of Canada from Manitoba